Lasiocroton harrisii is a species of plant in the family Euphorbiaceae. It is endemic to Jamaica and grows in thickets on limestone hills in a narrow altitudinal band.

References

Adelieae
Flora of Jamaica
Vulnerable plants
Endemic flora of Jamaica
Taxonomy articles created by Polbot